Richard Davey (1938–2013) was an Australian actor, director and writer.

Richard Davey may also refer to:

Richard Davey (MP) (1799–1884), British politician
Richard Davey (writer) (1848–1911), English author and journalist
Richard A. Davey, American attorney and transportation executive
Dick Davey, American college basketball coach